Chignal Smealy is a small village and former civil parish, now in the parish of Chignall, on the north-western outskirts of Chelmsford, Essex, England. The local church (St. Nicholas) is a red brick building, containing an unusual red brick baptismal font which has been used for many christenings. In 1881 the parish had a population of 134. On 24 March 1888 the parish was abolished to form Chignall.

The village was struck by an F1/T2 tornado on 23 November 1981, as part of the record-breaking nationwide tornado outbreak on that day.

The spelling of the village name is open to discussion. Sometimes it is spelt "Chignall Smealy" other times, it is spelt "Chignal Smealy".

The Queen's Birthday Flypast
The open views from the village give an opportunity to watch the Queen's Birthday Flypast in June each year. The route is classified but in previous years the flight has been routed over the village then on to Hainault Country Park, Fairlop station and finally to the Mall. A flypast 14 miles long passed overhead at a speed of 310 mph, concluded by Concorde escorted by the Red Arrows.

The Village
Chignall Smealy has a number of different clubs and groups including: Bowls Club, Chignal 4 Art, Cricket Club, Gardening Club, Wine Discovery, Women's Institute.

The Pig and Whistle is a traditional rural village pub, dating back to the mid-19th century

References

External links

 Chignal Parish Council Web Site

Villages in Essex
Former civil parishes in Essex